Wulatelong is an extinct genus of basal oviraptorid dinosaur known from the Late Cretaceous Wulansuhai Formation (Campanian stage) of Bayan Mandahu, Linhe District of Inner Mongolia, northern China. It contains a single species, Wulatelong gobiensis.

History

The fossils of Wulatelong, representing a single nearly-complete skeleton, now cataloged IVPP V 18409, were discovered in 2009 in the Bayan Mandahu area of Wulatehouqi, Inner Mongolia, a fossil-rich area which has yielded many recent dinosaur discoveries. The authors of the paper describing Wulatelong had previously described the dromaeosaurid Linheraptor (2010), the alvarezsaurid Linhenykus (2011), and the troodontid Linhevenator (2011). Wulatelong was described by Xu et al. in 2013. The generic name derives from Wulate, where the fossils were discovered, and long, the Chinese word for "dragon". The specific name, gobiensis, refers to the Gobi Desert.

Classification
Wulatelong is an oviraptorid dinosaur, the sister taxon of Banji. Oviraptorids were bird-like, herbivorous and omnivorous theropods characterized by toothless, parrot-like beaks, and often elaborate crests. They are known only from the Late Cretaceous of Asia.

Paleoecology
Wulatelong shared their habitat in the Bayan Mandahu with a number of other dinosaurian fauna. These included the ceratopsians Protoceratops and Magnirostris, the ankylosaurian Pinacosaurus, and a number of other theropods: the dromaeosaurids Velociraptor, ‘’Papiliovenator’’ and Linheraptor, the oviraptorosaurian Machairasaurus, the alvarezsauroid Linhenykus, and the troodontid Linhevenator. The authors of the paper describing Wulatelong concluded that the Bayan Mandahu fauna "differs fundamentally in composition from the classical Djadokhta fauna, perhaps because of a difference in age" or due to environmental factors.

See also

 Timeline of oviraptorosaur research
 2013 in paleontology

References

Late Cretaceous dinosaurs of Asia
Oviraptorids
Fossil taxa described in 2013
Taxa named by Xu Xing
Paleontology in Inner Mongolia